Brough, sometimes known as Brough under Stainmore, is a village and civil parish in the Eden district of Cumbria, England, on the western fringe of the Pennines near Stainmore.

Brough lies within the historic county of Westmorland. At the 2001 census it had a population of 680, increasing to 751 at the 2011 Census.

History
The village is on the site of the Roman fort of Verterae ("The Forts"), on the northern leg of the Roman-era Watling Street, linking Luguvalium (Carlisle) with Eboracum (York) and points south. The area of the rectangular fort, which once occupied the land to the south of the Swindale Beck, is now a Scheduled Ancient Monument.

Brough Castle was built in the 11th century within the northern part of the former fort.  Like many other castles in the area, Brough was restored in the 17th century by Lady Anne Clifford.  The Castle is now in the care of English Heritage and its ruins can be visited.

Brough has historically been divided into Market Brough, to the north, and Church Brough, to the south and centred on the castle and St Michael's Church. In 1977 this division was made physical by the construction of the Brough bypass dual carriageway, taking the A66 away from the village main street.

Up to some time before 1777, opposite the market cross going up towards Stainmore, there was a holy well dedicated to Saint Winifred (Gwenfrewi), which before the Reformation was a place of pilgrimage.

Nearby is Augill Castle, built in 1841 by John Bagot Pearson from Kirkby Lonsdale as a weekend retreat, a grade II listed building and now a hotel.

Governance
Brough is in the parliamentary constituency of Penrith and the Border. Neil Hudson was elected its Conservative Member of Parliament at the 2019 General Election, replacing Rory Stewart.

The holly tree tradition
Traditionally, on Twelfth Night, a burning holly tree (subsequently, ash trees were used) would be carried through the village, followed by a brass band. When the flames had partially gone out, the villagers would try to bring the tree to a pub, where the party would continue until the early hours of the morning. The village was also the venue for a popular fair on the second Thursday of March.

St Michael's church
St Michael's Church is a large building with an impressive tower. The oldest parts date from the Norman period, and may have suffered during William I of Scotland's attack on the castle in 1174. The church was enlarged in the 14th century, to add the north aisle, and in the early 16th century when most of the existing structure was built.

The tower was constructed by Thomas Blenkinsop of Helbeck in 1513. There are four bells, which are noted as the heaviest ring of 4 bells in the world. They were removed for restoration in 2022.

There is a large war memorial within the nave.

Events
Brough Agricultural Show, held every year in August.

Cumbria Easter Rally, held yearly on Easter weekend.

A monthly Farmers' Market held on the third Saturday of every month, in the Memorial Hall in Brough.

Brough Football Club
Brough Football Club is the local football team for the village. After being re-founded in 2020, Brough FC can be dated back to 1898, possibly even earlier. The club's home pitch is Coltsford Common in Church Brough.

Brough FC has a men's team in the Westmorland Football League, and an Under 16's team in the Kent Valley Football League.

The team plays in the club's traditional colours of blue and white stripes, with a red away kit.

Gallery

Governance
An electoral ward in the name of Brough exists. This ward stretches from Musgrave to Stainmore with a total population of  1,317.

See also

Listed buildings in Brough, Cumbria

References

External links

 Cumbria County History Trust: Brough under Stainmore (nb: provisional research only - see Talk page)

Villages in Cumbria
Civil parishes in Cumbria
Roman sites in Cumbria
Eden District